Carassius is a genus in the ray-finned fish family Cyprinidae. Most species in this genus are commonly known as crucian carps, though this term often specifically refers to C. carassius. The most well known is the goldfish (C. auratus). They have a Eurasian distribution, apparently originating further to the west than the typical carps (Cyprinus), which include the common carp (C. carpio).

Species of Carassius are not particularly close relatives of the typical carps of Cyprinus, but rather form a more basal lineage of the subfamily Cyprininae.

Species
 Carassius auratus (Linnaeus, 1758) (goldfish)
 Carassius auratus auratus (Linnaeus, 1758) 
 Carassius carassius (Linnaeus, 1758) (crucian carp) 
 Carassius cuvieri Temminck & Schlegel, 1846 (Japanese white crucian carp)
 Carassius gibelio (Bloch, 1782) (Prussian carp) 
 Carassius langsdorfii Temminck & Schlegel, 1846 (Ginbuna)
 Carassius praecipuus Kottelat, 2017

References

 
Cyprininae
Taxa named by Sven Nilsson